The following elections occurred in the year 1841.

 1841 Chilean presidential election

Europe

United Kingdom
 1841 United Kingdom general election

See also
 :Category:1841 elections

1841
Elections